

Buildings and structures

Buildings

 601–607 – Hōryū-ji (法隆寺) in Nara, Japan, built for the first time.
 605 – Completion of
 Anji Bridge (趙州橋 or Zhaozhou Bridge) in Sui dynasty China. The bridge was finished in 616.
 Jvari monastery in Georgia.
 611 – Four Gates Pagoda (四門塔) in Sui dynasty China is completed.
 613 – Abbey of Saint Gall in Switzerland founded.
 618 – St. Hripsime Church in Echmiadzin, Armenia built.
 634 – Omar ibn al-Khattab Mosque, Dumat al-Jandal, Arabia is completed.
 635 – Convent on Lindisfarne, off the coast of Bernicia (north east England), founded.
 636 – Xumi Pagoda (須彌塔) in Zhengding, Tang dynasty China, built.
 640 – Daqin Pagoda (大秦塔) in Chang'an, Tang dynasty China, completed.
 641 – Mosque of Amr ibn al-As in Fustat, Umayyad Egypt, begun.
 646 – Hwangnyongsa pagoda completed.

 652
 Giant Wild Goose Pagoda (大雁塔) in Chang'an, capital of Tang dynasty China, first built.
 Zvartnots Cathedral in Armenia built.
 654 – Jumièges Abbey in Normandy founded.
 661 – San Juan de Baños, Palencia in Visigothic Spain consecrated.
 662-663 – Penglai Palace renovated.
 669 – Kōfuku-ji (興福寺) Buddhist temple in Yamashina, Japan, first constructed.
 c. 670
 City of Kairouan in Tunisia and its Great Mosque founded.
 All Saints' Church, Brixworth in England founded.
 674 – Monkwearmouth-Jarrow Abbey in Northumbria founded.

 680
 Yakushi-ji (薬師寺) Buddhist temple first built in Fujiwara-kyō, capital of Asuka period Japan.
 Construction begins on San Pedro de la Nave church in Zamora, Visigothic Spain.
 c. 682 – Work begin on the construction of Fujiwara-kyō (藤原京) as the future capital of Japan (694-710).
 683 – Temple of Inscriptions built in the Maya city of Palenque.
 684 – Qianling Mausoleum (乾陵) near Chang'an, Tang dynasty China, completed.
 691-692 – Dome of the Rock in Jerusalem, Umayyad Empire, completed.
 692 – Temple of the Cross built in the Maya city of Palenque.
 698 – Abbey of Echternach in Luxembourg founded.
 Year unknown – Saint Frutuoso Chapel in Braga, Visigothic Kingdom, built.

See also
6th century in architecture
8th century in architecture
Timeline of architecture

References

Architecture